Miriam Rivera (1981 – 5 February 2019), known by the mononym Miriam, was a Mexican-born transgender model and TV personality, who resided in New York City, who became known for starring on the British reality television show There's Something About Miriam and guesting on Big Brother Australia 2004. She became recognized as the first openly transgender reality television star. Rivera also modelled and, using the name Victoria, performed in pornography.

Miriam was an activist and spokesmodel for the transgender community. 

She was found dead in February 2019 at her apartment in Sonora, Mexico. She was deemed to have died by suicide, but her husband believed she had been murdered.

In 2021, Wondery published an investigative podcast series into Rivera's life and her appearance on the show There's Something About Miriam titled Harsh Reality. In June 2022, a similar three-part documentary series, called Miriam: Death of a Reality Star, was commissioned by Channel 4 from Expectation Entertainment.

Life and career 
Rivera was born in 1981 in Mexico. She was born male, but displayed signs of gender dysphoria since the age of four. She said that while her three brothers liked baseball, she preferred Barbie dolls. Rivera said strangers assumed she was a girl:

Rivera said she soon started taking hormones. She told reporters she came out after being suspended from school at age 12, and her family was supportive.

Remy Blumenfeld first saw Rivera participating in a girl band, after which he planned to cast her in a TV show that was later released as There's Something About Miriam. She was filmed in Ibiza for There's Something About Miriam in 2003, but the show's airdate was delayed until out-of-court settlement of litigation by contestants in 2004. It originally aired in the United Kingdom on Sky1 in February 2004. Hosted by Tim Vincent, it featured six men wooing Rivera without revealing that she was transgender until the final episode. Rivera enjoyed the attention she received following the show.

After the high ratings for the show, she was cast as a guest on Big Brother Australia 2004, also produced by Endemol. A documentary about her life was commissioned but not aired.

She stated she never planned to have sex reassignment surgery, citing concerns about complications or loss of sensation. She said, "My mother always says to me, 'Why would you want to be half-and-half? Why don't you want to be a complete woman?' But I just love myself and I'm really enjoying my life."

The New York Post reported that Rivera was seriously injured in 2007 when she was thrown out of a third-story window at her home. Rivera later told reporters she fell out of a fourth-story window while trying to escape a burglar. In 2008, she was a special guest on Ewa Drzyzga's TVN show Rozmowy w toku in Poland.  In more recent years, Rivera was active in Manhattan's ball culture.

Personal life and death 
Rivera was married to Daniel Cuervo, with whom she lived in New York City. She was found dead on 5 February 2019, in her apartment in Mexico. Her death was confirmed by Cuervo in a Facebook post and received news coverage six months later. Her death was classified as suicide by hanging by the police, but Cuervo believes she was murdered.  Cuervo received a death threat from someone who told him to "never come back to Mexico" and not to prepare her funeral.

Filmography 
There's Something About Miriam (2003, Brighter Pictures)
Big Brother Australia 2004 (2004, Endemol)
TV Burp (2004)
Rove Live (2004)
Good Morning Australia (2004)

See also
 LGBT culture in New York City
 List of LGBT people from New York City

References

External links 

1981 births
2019 suicides
Big Brother (Australian TV series)
Mexican LGBT entertainers
Mexican LGBT actors
Mexican pornographic film actresses
Mexican television actresses
Transgender female models
LGBT media personalities
Transgender female adult models
Transgender pornographic film actresses
Mexican expatriates in the United States
Suicides by hanging in Mexico
LGBT-related suicides
Suicides in Mexico